Overnight Sensational, is a 2006 album by Sam Moore. This album was produced by Randy Jackson in 2006, and features artists like Jon Bon Jovi, Bekka Bramlett, Mariah Carey, Eric Clapton, Nikka Costa, Sheila E., Billy F. Gibbons, Vince Gill, Van Hunt, Billy Preston, Robert Randolph, Paul Rodgers, Bruce Springsteen, Sting, Travis Tritt, BeBe Winans, Steve Winwood, Wynonna, and Zucchero. It was released by Rhino Records.

Track listing
 "I Can't Stand The Rain" with Wynona, Bebe Winans & Billy Preston on organ
 "Better To Have And Not Need" with Bruce Springsteen
 "Blame It on the Rain" with Fantasia
 "Lookin' for a Love" with Jon Bon Jovi
 "Ain't No Love" with Steve Winwood
 "None of Us Are Free" with Sting & Sheila E. on percussion
 "It's Only Make Believe" with Mariah Carey & Vince Gill
 "Don't Play That Song (You Lied)" with Bekka Bramlett
 "If I Had No Loot" with Van Hunt, Nikka Costa & ZZ Top's Billy Gibbons on guitar
 "Ridin' Thumb" with Travis Tritt & Robert Randolph on pedal steel
 "We Shall Be Free" with Paul Rodgers
 "You Are So Beautiful" with Billy Preston, Zucchero & Eric Clapton on guitar

References

2006 albums
Rhino Records albums
Albums produced by Randy Jackson